1187 papal election may refer to:
 October 1187 papal election, which elected Gregory VIII to succeed Urban III
 December 1187 papal election, which elected Clement III to succeed Gregory VIII